Pamela Christine Ropner (20 April 1931 – 4 July 2013) was a British author. She was the daughter of Richard Ropner and Margaret Forbes Ronald, and graduated in 1951 from the University of Edinburgh, with an M.A.  She married the doctor and medical writer Tom Stuttaford in 1957, by whom she had 3 sons.

She died on 4 July 2013 at the age of 82 after a long illness.

Books
 The Golden Impala, (1957)  
 The House of the Bittern, (1965) 
 The Guardian Angel, (1966) 
 The Sea Friends, (1968)
 Helping Mr Paterson, (1982)

Awards
1959 Boys Club of America Junior Award for The Golden Impala

References

External links

Entry, The Peerage
Pamela Stuttaford obituary, Eastern Daily Press, 12 July 2013
 

1931 births
2013 deaths
Alumni of the University of Edinburgh
Place of birth missing
Place of death missing
20th-century British novelists